Karinou Airlines is an airline based in Bangui, Central African Republic. It operates scheduled passenger services to a range of destinations across Africa.

History 
Karinou Airlines commenced charter operations under African Airlines. The business model was not working for the airline.  Subsequently, less than one year later they rebranded as Karinou Airlines, changing their business model from charter to scheduled operations.

Shortly after the rebranding, in early 2013, Karinou Airlines began operating scheduled passenger flights to ten destinations across the African continent reportedly using a capital base of US$100 million.

In March 2013, after rebel fighters moved into Bangui, President Francois Bozizé was shown to have fled to the Democratic Republic of Congo on board a Karinou Airlines aircraft.

Destinations 
Karinou Airlines serves the following destinations (as of August 2013):

Fleet 

The Karinou Airlines fleet consists of the following aircraft (as of August 2019):

References

External links 

Airlines of the Central African Republic
Airlines established in 2012
2012 establishments in the Central African Republic